The 1922 Furman Purple Hurricane football team represented the Furman University as a member of the Southern Intercollegiate Athletic Association (SIAA) during the 1922 college football season. Led by eighth-year head coach Billy Laval, the Purple Hurricane compiled an overall record of 8–3 with a mark of 3–0 in conference play, winning the SIAA title. The team upset Florida.

Schedule

References

Furman
Furman Paladins football seasons
Furman Purple Hurricane football